Chanceaux is a commune in the Côte-d'Or department in eastern France.

Chanceaux is located 5 kilometers from the source of the Seine.

Population

See also
Communes of the Côte-d'Or department

References

Communes of Côte-d'Or